The first season of Junior Bake Off Brasil premiered on January 6, 2018 at 9:30 p.m. on SBT.

Bakers
The following is a list of contestants:

Results summary

Key
  Advanced
  Judges' favourite bakers
  Star Baker
  Withdrew
  Eliminated
  Judges' bottom bakers
  Returned
  Runner-up
  Winner

Ratings and reception

Brazilian ratings
All numbers are in points and provided by Kantar Ibope Media.

References

External links 

 Junior Bake Off Brasil on SBT

2018 Brazilian television seasons